Marie's vole (Volemys musseri) is a species of rodent in the family Cricetidae. 
It is found only in China.  Volemys musseri is one of two species in the genus Volemys along with the Szechuan vole (Volemys millicens).

References

Musser, G. G. and M. D. Carleton. 2005. Superfamily Muroidea. pp. 894–1531 in Mammal Species of the World a Taxonomic and Geographic Reference. D. E. Wilson and D. M. Reeder eds. Johns Hopkins University Press, Baltimore.

Volemys
Mammals described in 1982
Rodents of China
Taxonomy articles created by Polbot
Endemic fauna of China